Northwood High School may refer to:

 Northwood High School (Irvine, California)
 Northwood High School (Louisiana)
 Northwood High School (Montgomery County, Maryland)
 NorthWood High School, Nappanee, Indiana
 Northwood High School (North Carolina), Pittsboro, North Carolina
 Northwood High School (Ohio), Northwood, Ohio
 Northwood High School (Saltville, Virginia)
 Northwood High School (Wisconsin), Minong, Wisconsin
 Northwood School (Lake Placid, New York)